Noel Everett (16 February 1936 – 12 August 2006) was a New Zealand sailor. He competed in the Dragon event at the 1972 Summer Olympics.

References

External links
 

1936 births
2006 deaths
New Zealand male sailors (sport)
Olympic sailors of New Zealand
Sailors at the 1972 Summer Olympics – Dragon
People from Richmond, New Zealand